The Contenders Hurdle is a Listed National Hunt hurdle race in Great Britain which is open to horses aged four years or older. It is run at Sandown Park over a distance of about 2 miles (1 mile 7 furlongs and 216 yards, or 3,319 metres), and during its running there are eight hurdles to be jumped. The race is scheduled to take place each year in late January or early February.

The race was first run in 1949 and was originally titled the Oteley Hurdle, and it was contested over a length of 2 miles (3,219 metres). Winners in the 1970s included Lanzarote and Sea Pigeon, and during the 1980s it was won by Desert Orchid and See You Then.

From the early 1990s until 2007 the race was sponsored by Agfa, and it was known as the Agfa Hurdle. In 1993 its distance was extended by 110 yards (about 100 metres) to the current length. It is now sponsored by Betfred. The 2008 running was classed at Grade 2 level, but the event was reverted to its former Listed status in 2009. Prior to 2010 it was open to horses aged five and over. The race often serves as a trial for the Champion Hurdle, and the most recent horse to win both events in the same year is Buveur d'Air in 2017 and 2018.

The race was discontinued as of 2023.  Nicky Henderson who had won six of the last twelve runnings lamented the fact that it would be no longer an option for preparing his intended Champion Hurdle candidates saying "I had my favourite race at Sandown, it was worth nothing, but was perfect timing - but not surprisingly, it only had three or four runners (every year) and they've done away with it."

Winners
 Amateur jockeys indicated by "Mr".

 The 1982 race was run at Kempton.

 The 1990 running was abandoned because of waterlogging.

 The 2012 running was abandoned due to frost.

 The 2013 race was run at Doncaster after the original meeting at Sandown became chase only due to the waterlogged state of the hurdle course

 The 2014 running was abandoned due to going conditions.

 The 2021 running was abandoned due to waterlogging and the meeting featured an all chase card instead.

See also
 Horseracing in Great Britain
 List of British National Hunt races

References

 Racing Post:
 
 pedigreequery.com – Contenders Hurdle – Sandown.

National Hunt races in Great Britain
Sandown Park Racecourse
National Hunt hurdle races